Twenty teams participated in the 1994 ICC Trophy, the fifth edition of the tournament. Three teams – Ireland, Namibia, and the United Arab Emirates – were making their debuts, while West Africa returned to the tournament for the first time since the 1982 edition. Zimbabwe, the winner of the past three tournaments, did not return, as they had been made full members of the International Cricket Council (ICC).

Argentina
Only players who appeared in at least one match at the tournament are listed. The leading run-scorer is marked with a dagger (†) and the leading wicket-taker with a double dagger (‡).

 Leo Alonso
 Sergio Ciaburri
 Martin Cortabarria
 Alejandro Ferguson
 Tony Ferguson
 Donald Forrester †
 Alexander Gooding
 Bernardo Irigoyen

 Lorenzo Jooris
 Guillermo Kirschbaum
 Miguel Morris
 Hernan Pereyra ‡
 Andres Perez Rivero
 Brian Roberts
 P. M. Roca
 Christian Tuñon

Source: ESPNcricinfo

Bangladesh
Only players who appeared in at least one match at the tournament are listed. The leading run-scorer is marked with a dagger (†) and the leading wicket-taker with a double dagger (‡).

 Akram Khan
 Aminul Islam
 Athar Ali Khan
 Enamul Haque
 Faruk Ahmed
 Gholam Nousher
 Jahangir Alam †
 Jahangir Alam Talukdar

 Minhajul Abedin ‡
 Mizanur Rahman
 Nasir Ahmed
 Selim Shahid
 Shanewas Shahid
 Sharfuddoula
 Shariful Haque

Source: ESPNcricinfo

Bermuda
Only players who appeared in at least one match at the tournament are listed. The leading run-scorer is marked with a dagger (†) and the leading wicket-taker with a double dagger (‡).

 Terry Burgess
 Pacer Edwards ‡
 Noel Gibbons
 Arnold Manders
 Charlie Marshall
 Dean Minors
 Bruce Perinchief

 Kenny Phillip
 Jeff Richardson
 Clay Smith
 Dexter Smith †
 Albert Steede
 Clevie Wade

Source: ESPNcricinfo

Canada
Only players who appeared in at least one match at the tournament are listed. The leading run-scorer is marked with a dagger (†) and the leading wicket-taker with a double dagger (‡).

 Errol Barrow
 Steve Dutchin
 Derick Etwaroo
 Tony Gardner ‡
 Nigel Isaacs
 Shantha Jayasekera
 Davis Joseph
 Ingleton Liburd †

 Don Maxwell
 Martin Prashad
 Paul Prashad
 Danny Ramnarais
 Barry Seebaran
 Bhawan Singh
 Danny Singh

Source: ESPNcricinfo

Denmark
Only players who appeared in at least one match at the tournament are listed. The leading run-scorer is marked with a dagger (†) and the leading wicket-taker with a double dagger (‡).

 Aftab Ahmed
 Atif Butt †
 Mogens Christiansen
 Allan From-Hansen
 Jesper Gregersen
 Søren Henriksen
 Ole Mortensen ‡

 Per Pedersen
 Henrik Pfaff
 Mohammad Saddiq
 Mogens Seider
 Lejf Slebsager
 Carsten Strandvig
 Søren Vestergaard

Source: ESPNcricinfo

East and Central Africa
Only players who appeared in at least one match at the tournament are listed. The leading run-scorer is marked with a dagger (†) and the leading wicket-taker with a double dagger (‡).

 Haroon Bags
 Imran Brohi †
 S. Dassu
 R. Davda
 M. Dhirani
 Steven Kapere ‡
 Said Malama
 B. Mehta

 A. Merchant
 Kazim Nasser
 P. Patel
 Yekesh Patel
 K. Sabsali
 Faizel Sarigat
 James Shikuku
 Vali Tarmohamed

Source: ESPNcricinfo

Fiji
Only players who appeared in at least one match at the tournament are listed. The leading run-scorer is marked with a dagger (†) and the leading wicket-taker with a double dagger (‡).

 Taione Batina
 Cecil Browne
 Taione Cakacaka
 Stephen Campbell
 Safania Jitoko
 Joeli Mateyawa ‡
 Taniela Naulivou

 Satya Raju
 Jason Rouse †
 Jone Seuvou
 Asaeli Sorovakatini
 Lesi Sorovakatini
 Atunaisi Tawatatau
 Richard Wotta

Source: ESPNcricinfo

Gibraltar
Only players who appeared in at least one match at the tournament are listed. The leading run-scorer is marked with a dagger (†) and the leading wicket-taker with a double dagger (‡).

Coach:  Richard Cox

 D. Beltran
 Bob Brooks ‡
 Richard Buzaglo
 Tim Buzaglo
 Clive Clinton
 Gary De'Ath
 Terence Garcia

 Adrian Hewitt
 Vince Kenny
 Wilfred Perez
 Rudolph Phillips
 Jeffrey Rhodes
 Stephen Shephard
 D. Stimson

Source: ESPNcricinfo

Hong Kong
Only players who appeared in at least one match at the tournament are listed. The leading run-scorer is marked with a dagger (†) and the leading wicket-taker with a double dagger (‡).

 Steve Atkinson
 Leigh Beaman
 Stewart Brew †‡
 Ray Brewster
 Paul Cresswell
 David Cross
 Tim Davies
 Mark Eames

 Riaz Farcy
 Pat Fordham
 John Garden
 Jonathan Orders
 Justin Strachan
 Ravi Sujanani
 Yarman Vachha

Source: ESPNcricinfo

Ireland
Only players who appeared in at least one match at the tournament are listed. The leading run-scorer is marked with a dagger (†) and the leading wicket-taker with a double dagger (‡).

 Justin Benson †
 Mark Cohen
 Dekker Curry
 Neil Doak
 Angus Dunlop
 Uel Graham
 Garfield Harrison
 Conor Hoey

 Paul Jackson
 Alan Lewis
 Charles McCrum ‡
 Paul McCrum
 Brian Millar
 Edward Moore
 Alan Nelson
 Michael Rea

Source: ESPNcricinfo

Israel
Only players who appeared in at least one match at the tournament are listed. The leading run-scorer is marked with a dagger (†) and the leading wicket-taker with a double dagger (‡).

 Raymond Aston ‡
 Hillel Awasker
 Aby Daniels
 Benjamin David ‡
 Jacky Divekar
 Mark Hamburger
 Michael Jacob ‡
 Nissam Jhirad

 Davis Moss
 R. Nichol
 Stanley Perlman
 Shimshon Raj
 S. Samuel
 Avi Talkar
 G. Talkar
 Neil Ward †

Source: ESPNcricinfo

Kenya
Only players who appeared in at least one match at the tournament are listed. The leading run-scorer is marked with a dagger (†) and the leading wicket-taker with a double dagger (‡).

 Rajab Ali ‡
 Dipak Chudasama
 Sandeep Gupta
 Tariq Iqbal
 Aasif Karim ‡
 Sibtain Kassamali
 Alfred Njuguna
 Martin Odumbe

 Maurice Odumbe †
 Tito Odumbe
 Kennedy Otieno
 Martin Suji
 David Tikolo
 Steve Tikolo
 Tom Tikolo

Source: ESPNcricinfo

Malaysia
Only players who appeared in at least one match at the tournament are listed. The leading run-scorer is marked with a dagger (†) and the leading wicket-taker with a double dagger (‡).

 S. Bell
 George Benzier
 Rakesh Chander
 T. Mathew
 Ramesh Menon
 Marimuthu Muniandy
 Suresh Navaratnam
 Desmon Patrik

 Dinesh Ramadas ‡
 Kunjiraman Ramadas
 Edward Seah
 Rohan Selvaratnam
 Tan Kim Hing ‡
 David Thalalla †
 Santhara Vello

Source: ESPNcricinfo

Namibia
Only players who appeared in at least one match at the tournament are listed. The leading run-scorer is marked with a dagger (†) and the leading wicket-taker with a double dagger (‡).

 Wayne Ackerman
 Mark Barnard
 Ettienne Brits
 Trevor Britten
 Norman Curry
 Andy Fallis
 Morne Karg
 Danie Keulder

 Deon Kotze
 Lennie Louw
 Martin Martins
 Gavin Murgatroyd †‡
 André Smith
 Ian van Schoor
 Melt van Schoor

Source: ESPNcricinfo

Netherlands
Only players who appeared in at least one match at the tournament are listed. The leading run-scorer is marked with a dagger (†) and the leading wicket-taker with a double dagger (‡).

 Flavian Aponso
 Leon Bouter
 Nolan Clarke †
 Tim de Leede
 Ewout de Man
 Floris Jansen ‡
 Phil Keukelaar
 Bart Kuijlman

 Joost Leemhuis
 Roland Lefebvre
 Steven Lubbers
 Reinout Scholte
 Jeroen Smits
 Robert van Oosterom
 Huib Visée ‡

Source: ESPNcricinfo

Papua New Guinea
Only players who appeared in at least one match at the tournament are listed. The leading run-scorer is marked with a dagger (†) and the leading wicket-taker with a double dagger (‡).

 Numa Alu
 Charles Amini
 Tau Ao
 Fred Arua ‡
 Toka Gaudi
 Babani Harry
 Kosta Ilaraki
 Api Leka

 Leka Leka
 William Maha
 Aukuma Noka
 Lakani Oala
 Vavine Pala
 Ola Raka
 Tuku Raka
 G. Rarua †

Source: ESPNcricinfo

Singapore
Only players who appeared in at least one match at the tournament are listed. The leading run-scorer is marked with a dagger (†) and the leading wicket-taker with a double dagger (‡).

 N. Amarasuriya
 A. Frazer
 Goh Swee Heng
 Imran Hamid
 Champaklal Kantilal
 Chris Kilbee
 Keith Martens

 Thaiyar Mohamed †
 Stacey Muruthi
 Mohanvelu Neethianathan
 R. Ramkrishnan
 T. E. Seal
 J. Stevenson ‡
 Ravi Thambinayagam

Source: ESPNcricinfo

United Arab Emirates
Only players who appeared in at least one match at the tournament are listed. The leading run-scorer is marked with a dagger (†) and the leading wicket-taker with a double dagger (‡).

 Ali Akbar
 Arshad Laeeq ‡
 Azhar Saeed †
 Imtiaz Abbasi
 Johanne Samarasekera
 Mazhar Hussain
 Mohammad Hyder

 Mohammad Ishaq
 Riaz Poonawala
 S. Khan
 Saleem Raza
 Sohail Butt
 Sultan Zarawani
 Vijay Mehra

Source: ESPNcricinfo

United States
Only players who appeared in at least one match at the tournament are listed. The leading run-scorer is marked with a dagger (†) and the leading wicket-taker with a double dagger (‡).

 Aijaz Ali
 Zamin Amin ‡
 Hopeton Barrett
 Reginald Benjamin
 Hubert Blackman
 Raymond Denny
 Alvin Howard
 Derek Kallicharran

 Rudy Lachman
 Edward Lewis
 Sew Shivnarine
 Paul Singh †
 Shawn Skeete
 Albert Texeira
 Garfield Wildman
 Ken Williams

Source: ESPNcricinfo

West Africa
Only players who appeared in at least one match at the tournament are listed. The leading run-scorer is marked with a dagger (†) and the leading wicket-taker with a double dagger (‡).

 Kome Agodo
 Gbenga Akinyombo
 Tony Ayamah
 J. O. Elliot
 Johnny Gomez
 L. Idowu
 Albert Kpundeh
 Sahr Kpundeh

 Uche Ntinu
 Donald Ovberedjo
 Kofi Sagoe
 Kwesi Sagoe
 A. Samu
 Okon Ukpong †
 Daniel Vanderpuje-Orgle ‡
 George Wiltshire

Source: ESPNcricinfo

Sources
 CricketArchive: Averages by teams, ABN-AMRO ICC Trophy 1993/94
 ESPNcricinfo: Unibind ABN-AMRO ICC Trophy, 1993/94 / Statistics

Cricket squads
ICC World Cup Qualifier